Good Women is a 1921 American silent drama film directed by Louis J. Gasnier and starring Rosemary Theby, Hamilton Revelle and Earl Schenck.

Cast
 Rosemary Theby as 	Katherine Brinkley
 Hamilton Revelle as 	Nicolai Brouevitch
 Irene Blackwell as 	Inna Brouevitch
 Earl Schenck as 	John Wilmot
 William P. Carleton as Sir Richard Egglethorpe
 Arthur Stuart Hull as Franklin Shelby
 Rhea Mitchell as 	Natalie Shelby
 Eugenie Besserer as Mrs. Emmeline Shelby

References

Bibliography
 Connelly, Robert B. The Silents: Silent Feature Films, 1910-36, Volume 40, Issue 2. December Press, 1998.
 Munden, Kenneth White. The American Film Institute Catalog of Motion Pictures Produced in the United States, Part 1. University of California Press, 1997.

External links
 

1921 films
1921 drama films
1920s English-language films
American silent feature films
Silent American drama films
American black-and-white films
Films directed by Louis J. Gasnier
Film Booking Offices of America films
1920s American films